Major General The Honourable Edward James Montagu-Stuart-Wortley,  (31 July 1857 – 19 March 1934) was a senior British Army officer. He saw extensive active service in many parts of world, including Afghanistan, South Africa, Egypt, Turkey, Malta, Sudan, France and Ireland. He was the source of the "interview" with Kaiser Wilhelm II that was the basis of the Daily Telegraph Affair that weakened the Kaiser's political power in Germany. During the First World War he was controversially dismissed after the Battle of the Somme due to the failure of his division's diversionary attack.

Early life
Wortley was born on 31 July 1857, the second son of Francis Dudley Montagu-Stuart-Wortley, grandson of John Stuart-Wortley-Mackenzie, 2nd Baron Wharncliffe, and nephew of Edward Montagu-Stuart-Wortley-Mackenzie, 1st Earl of Wharncliffe.
He attended Eton College from 1866 and gained a commission in the King's Royal Rifle Corps (60th Foot) on 13 October 1877.

Imperial wars
Montagu-Stuart-Wortley served as Superintendent of Army Signalling for the Kurram Valley Field Force during the Second Anglo–Afghan War (1878–80). After the First Boer War broke out in December 1880, with the Boer Commandos in the Transvaal besieging British garrisons there, the Governor of Natal Sir George Pomeroy Colley raised the Natal Field Force; Montagu-Stuart-Wortley served with the Natal Field Force in the actions at Laing's Nek, Schuinshoogte and Majuba Hill.

In 1881 he acted as a Military Secretary to General Valentine Baker who at that time was in command of the Egyptian police and then, during the Anglo-Egyptian War, was aide-de-camp to Major General Sir Evelyn Wood. In 1884–85 he took part in the Nile Expedition to relieve General Gordon who was besieged in Khartoum and took part in the Abu Klea on 17 January 1885. In 1885 he accompanied Conservative politician Sir Henry Drummond Wolff to Constantinople as a military attaché. Later that year he was appointed as Deputy Assistant Adjutant General to Sir Francis Grenfell as he led his division at the Battle of Ginnis.

After attending Staff College, Camberley in 1889 he became a brigade major serving in Malta from 1893 to 1896. He was promoted to the substantive rank of major 4 April 1894, and was appointed a companion of the Order of St Michael and St George (CMG) in 1896. Lord Kitchener led a second Nile Campaign from 1896 where Stuart-Wortley was second in command of a gunboat flotilla and later led a band of Arab irregulars who secured the east bank of the Nile in the battle of Omdurman. For his services in this campaign he received a Distinguished Service Order (DSO) in November 1898.

During the Second Boer War Stuart-Wortley commanded a composite battalion of the King's Royal Rifles Corps and Rifle Brigade (Prince Consort's Own) at the Battle of the Tugela Heights, assisting in the Relief of Ladysmith. In July 1901, he received the promotion to lieutenant-colonel, and was appointed a military attaché to Paris, a post he would hold for three years.

In the summer of 1907 Kaiser Wilhelm rented Stuart-Wortley's home Highcliffe Castle whilst he recovered from an acute throat trouble. In return for his hospitality Edward was given two stained glass windows for the castle and invited to visit the German Army's manoeuvres at Alsace the next year. Stuart-Wortley had several conversations with the Kaiser, during which Wilhelm II explained that he desired and had always worked towards, positive relations with Britain. Stuart-Wortley, believing the Kaiser, decided that publicizing these views would counteract the anti-German sentiment in Britain that was rising during the Anglo-German naval arms race. He thus wrote up his notes from his meetings and handed them over to a journalist from The Daily Telegraph in September 1908. Although the transcript had first been submitted to the Kaiser's staff for approval, the text was not properly checked by German officials, and the publication of the notes as an "interview" with the Kaiser resulted in the Daily Telegraph Affair that infuriated the British public and weakened the political power of the Kaiser within Germany.

Between 1908 and 1912 Stuart-Wortley commanded the 10th Infantry Brigade at Shorncliffe Army Camp.

First World War
On 1 June 1914, during the First World War, Major General Montagu-Stuart-Wortley became GOC of the 46th (North Midland) Division, a Territorial Force division. In October 1915, the Division saw action in France during the Battle of Loos when it made a costly attack against the Hohenzollern Redoubt and Fosse 8. Wortley proposed a bombing attack, but was overruled and ordered to go ahead with a frontal attack by General Richard Haking (his Corps commander). In the event, the attack was a disastrous failure and the Division lost 180 officers and 3,583 men killed, wounded or missing. The action was described in the Official History as a "tragic waste of infantry".

Despite his reputation as an excellent trainer of troops, the perceived poor performance and high casualty rates of the 46th Division at the Hohenzollern Redoubt and again at Gommecourt, would result in Stuart-Wortley being made a scapegoat for failure. Woods argues that, as there is no evidence to suggest Stuart-Wortley lacked competence or failed in his duties at the Hohenzollern attack and that these charges are largely unfair.

Stuart-Wortley had argued for a limited and methodical attack: using the 'bite and hold' tactic which had emerged at Neuve Chapelle. This was especially important because of the limited resources available to him: the number of artillery pieces, artillery planning, counter-battery spotting, the quantity, type and efficiency of shells, the quantity and use of gas and smoke and a uniform issue of effective, standard bombs. To his credit, the twenty-two critical and useful tactical points Stuart-Wortley formed from his analysis of the Battle of Loos suggests he was an open-minded commander keen to learn and develop from past experiences.

Accusations against planners and commanders followed the attack. Lieutenant Colonel Josiah Wedgwood, MP for Staffordshire, wrote directly to Prime Minister H. H. Asquith with a report summarising his discussions with survivors and wounded of 137th Brigade. He argued that a change in general would restore morale and asked why over-confident objectives had been set. Asquith immediately sent the letter to Haig, who rejected most of Wedgwood's findings laying the blame on the ineffectual fighting quality and lack of courage of the Territorial troops and on Stuart-Wortley, their commander. Haig's evidence came from a gas officer who alleged that when the gas was released "for nearly an hour ... there was no hostile fire in the ground ... Yet the Territorials in question only advanced to our old trench line and held!", and that "the attack was made by officers and NCOs, but few rank and file followed them." Lord Cavan, commanding the Guards Division informed Haig: "that the companies of the 46th Division who had been ordered to attack towards the line of the Dump-Quarries did not go forward 40 yards".

Haig concluded that there was a "want of discipline in the 46th Division and general ignorance of war conditions".

Woods argues that Haig's criticism of 46th Division is unfair and based on doubtful evidence. "The comments from the unnamed gas officer can easily be explained by the hour between the gas being released (1pm) and the commencement of the infantry attack (2pm). The artillery plan directed the intense two-hour barrage toward more rear-ward targets from 1pm, to allow the gas to be directed toward the first line of enemy trenches".

Woods' analysis of the battalion, brigade and divisional War Diaries clearly shows that the assault formations left their own trenches and advanced at their allotted time. It wasn't the "want of discipline" that restricted 137th Brigade's advance but the dreadful casualties suffered in their limited advance against unbroken German defences. Woods suggests that both morale and discipline were high in 46th Division. Indeed, the War Diaries suggest that many soldiers were forced to retire from positions beyond Cavan's 40 yards.

Despite both Haig and Haking approving Divisional plans, Haig reserved particular criticism for Stuart-Wortley. Haig wrote: "I do not think much of Major-General Stuart-Wortley as a Divisional Commander and have already spoken to the GOC XI Corps on the subject". Stuart-Wortley appears to have follow the plans to the best of his limited options. Woods suggests that it may have been that Stuart-Wortley's original idea – of a series of limited, step-by-step attacks – was seen as unambitious, over-cautious and indicative of a man lacking in 'offensive spirit'. 

Though Gary Sheffield, in his biography of Haig, is largely supportive of his performance in the First World War, he describes Haig as "ungenerous" and "unfair" in his blame of Stuart-Wortley for the failure at the Hohenzollern Redoubt.

Woods concludes that Stuart-Wortley was likely unaware that he was a pawn in a bigger game of personal politics being played out in the most senior ranks of the British Army, twelve days before Haig succeeded French.

Wortley incurred Haig's displeasure by writing regularly to King George V about the activities of the 46th Division (despite having the permission of Sir John French to do so). This, and the disagreement with Haking about the Hohenzollern Redoubt attack, left Wortley as a "marked man" against whom Haig conspired". At the time of the opening of the Somme, he was a few weeks short of his 59th birthday, but in ill-health, suffering from sciatica. Despite his experience, he was "past his fighting best"  and his fitness for operational command was questionable. One officer later described him in 1916 as:

"a worn-out man, who never visited his front line and was incapable of inspiring any enthusiasm."

Gommecourt
As part of Lieutenant-General Sir Edmund Allenby's British Third Army, the 46th Division was involved in the diversionary Attack on the Gommecourt Salient on the first day of the Battle of the Somme, on 1 July 1916.
The initial attack by the Division launched from trenches located at the village of Foncquevillers at 7.30 A.M. failed within a half an hour of its commencement with heavy casualties from enemy fire, most of the Division's troops seeking cover and becoming entrapped in its own assembly trenches.
Montagu-Stuart-Wortley was ordered to renew the attack at midday as the neighbouring 56th (1/1st London) Division – a fellow Territorial Force Division – on its right had made good progress but was in need of support as it came under increasing counter-attack from numerically-superior rallying German forces besetting it on three sides simultaneously, another British attack to the immediate south at Serre also having failed. The 46th Divisional infantry force by this time however had become incapable of doing this due a chaotic situation in its own trenches, and was unable to seriously re-engage for the rest of the day.
After continual failed attempts to organize a renewed attack by his troops throughout the morning and early afternoon, it was clear to Montagu Stuart-Wortley that there was no prospect of success, but at 3.30 P.M. under pressure from senior command's exhortations he ordered a token effort to be made by two rifle companies of men, only one platoon of 20 men actually going over-the-top on the receipt of the order, with only 2 men of it surviving the attempt unscathed.

In the evening the 56th Division was forced back out of the enemy trenches after 13 hours of continuous heavy fighting within the German position on its own, having sustained very heavy losses, sealing the defeat of the overall operation at Gommecourt. Thus the 46th Division's attack failed completely, and it further had the distinction of suffering the lowest casualties in 2 455 killed, wounded and missing of 13 British divisions engaged that day. It was subsequently judged responsible for the failure of the Gommecourt action in having left its fellow Territorials from London to fight alone in an impossible tactical situation, and was thereafter dogged by a reputation for being a poor quality military formation, a reputation that it would not come out from under the shadow of until its spectacular victory in the crossing of the St. Quentin Canal in 1918.

Reporting on the attack after its failure VII Corps commander, Lieutenant-General Thomas D'Oyly Snow, stated in official correspondence:

"the 46th Division ... showed a lack of offensive spirit. I can only attribute this to the fact that its commander, Major-General the Hon. E.J. Montagu Stuart-Wortley, is not of an age, neither has he the constitution, to allow him to be as much among his men in the front lines as is necessary to imbue all ranks with confidence and spirit."

General Snow ordered a Court of Inquiry on 4 July 1916 into the actions of the 46th Division during the attack, but before it delivered its findings General Haig as Commander-in-Chief ordered Montagu-Stuart-Wortley to leave the field and return to England.

Given that Montagu Stuart-Wortley's orders prior to the attack had been "to occupy the ground that is won by the artillery" his dismissal remains a subject of controversy. According to Alan MacDonald, "the Division and its General were made scapegoats for the failure of a fatally flawed concept dreamt up by higher authority – the diversionary attack at Gommecourt".

Later life
Upon his return home he was appointed to the backwater command of the 65th (2nd Lowland) Division in Ireland until March 1919. He retired from the British Army on 31 July 1919. Post-war, Wortley made several protests to the Government about the perceived injustice that he had suffered at its hands, particularly with regard to not having received the customary honours issued to commanders of Divisional rank in the war, but to no avail. He died 19 March 1934 at age 76.

Personal life

Edward married Violet Hunter Guthrie on 5 February 1891; she was the daughter of James Alexander Guthrie, 4th Baron of Craigie and her sister Rose Ellinor Guthrie was married to General the Hon Sir Cecil Edward Bingham. They had three children Major Nicholas Rothesay Stuart-Wortley (1892–1926), Louise Violet Beatrice Montagu-Stuart-Wortley (1893-1970) and Elizabeth Valetta Montagu-Stuart-Wortley (1896–1978).

Edward's older brother the Hon Sir Francis Montagu-Stuart-Wortley-Mackenzie succeeded to the Earldom of Wharncliffe and his younger brother the Hon Sir Alan Richard Montagu-Stuart-Wortley KCMG DSO KCB became a lieutenant-general in the British Army serving throughout the First World War.

Notes

Bibliography
 Robert Franklin, The Fringes of History: The Life and Times of Edward Stuart Wortley (Natula Publications, 2003)

External links
 Centre for First World War Studies: Edward James Montagu-Stuart-Wortley

|-

1857 births
1934 deaths
Military personnel from London
British Army major generals
British military personnel of the Second Anglo-Afghan War
British military personnel of the First Boer War
British Army personnel of the Anglo-Egyptian War
British military personnel of the Mahdist War
British Army personnel of the Second Boer War
British Army generals of World War I
Companions of the Distinguished Service Order
Companions of the Order of St Michael and St George
Companions of the Order of the Bath
Members of the Royal Victorian Order
Graduates of the Staff College, Camberley
King's Royal Rifle Corps officers
Conservative Party (UK) parliamentary candidates